Lucky Luke is a 2009 French-Argentine Western adventure film directed by James Huth and starring Jean Dujardin, who also co-wrote the screenplay. It is based on the comic series of the same name by Morris. The film includes a cameo by Argentine writer and TV host Alberto Laiseca.

Synopsis 
Delegated by US President Winston H. Jameson to secure Daisy Town in order to make the junction of the East-West railway in time, "Lucky" John Luke returns to his hometown, now dominated by the crook Pat Poker. Haunted by old demons, Lucky Luke sees his ambitions to start a new life and "make it clean" soon thwarted by the arrival of old enemies.

Cast

Reception 
Lucky Luke received mixed reviews, while the direction, visual style and acting received acclaim, the screenplay received criticism.

See also 
 Lucky Luke (1991 film)

References

External links 
 

2009 films
2009 Western (genre) films
2000s French-language films
Lucky Luke films
French Western (genre) films
Films based on Belgian comics
Live-action films based on comics
Argentine Western (genre) films
Films directed by James Huth
2000s French films
2000s Argentine films
Foreign films set in the United States